The National Deaf Academic Bowl is an academic competition for deaf and hard of hearing students founded by Gallaudet University in 1997.

Past Champions
 1997 National Champions: California School for the Deaf, Riverside
 1998 National Champions: California School for the Deaf, Fremont
 1999 National Champions: California School for the Deaf, Fremont
 2000 National Champions: Model Secondary School for the Deaf
 2001 National Champions: Model Secondary School for the Deaf
 2002 National Champions: Florida School for the Deaf
 2003 National Champions: Indiana School for the Deaf
 2004 National Champions: Colorado School for the Deaf and Blind
 2005 National Champions: Maryland School for the Deaf
 2006 National Champions: Mountain Lakes High School
 2007 National Champions: John Hersey High School
 2008 National Champions: Indiana School for the Deaf
 2009 National Champions: University High School (Irvine, California)
 2010 National Champions: Maryland School for the Deaf
 2011 National Champions: Maryland School for the Deaf
 2012 National Champions: Maryland School for the Deaf
 2013 National Champions: Maryland School for the Deaf 
 2014 National Champions: Model Secondary School for the Deaf 
 2015 National Champions: Indiana School for the Deaf 
 2016 National Champions: Rockville High School
 2017 National Champions: Indiana School for the Deaf
 2018 National Champions: Indiana School for the Deaf
 2019 National Champions: John Hersey High School

National Most Outstanding Players
The National Most Outstanding Player Award is the most individual prestigious award that can be given out each year during the National Competitions.
 2002 National Most Outstanding Player: Tim Woodford (Senior) Florida School for the Deaf and Blind
 2003 National Most Outstanding Player: Pia Marie Paulone (Senior) Indiana School for the Deaf
 2004 National Most Outstanding Player: Andrew Ek (Senior) Colorado School for the Deaf
 2005 National Most Outstanding Player: Tyler DeShaw (Senior) Roosevelt High School
 2006 National Most Outstanding Player: David Uzzell (Junior) John Hersey High School
 2007 National Most Outstanding Player: David Uzzell (Senior) John Hersey High School
 2008 National Most Outstanding Player: Allison Weiner (Senior) Maryland School for the Deaf
 2009 National Most Outstanding Player: Gianni Manganelli (Senior) University High School
 2010 National Most Outstanding Player: Bri Herold (Senior) Metro Deaf School / Minnesota North Star Academy
 2011 National Most Outstanding Player: Paige Foreman (Junior) New Mexico School for the Deaf
 2012 National Most Outstanding Player: Ted Zoerner (Junior) University High School
 2013 National Most Outstanding Player: Ethan Sonnenstrahl (Senior) Maryland School for the Deaf
 2014 National Most Outstanding Player: Jason Antal (Senior) Florida School for the Deaf and Blind
 2015 National Most Outstanding Player: Tayla Newman (Senior) Maryland School for the Deaf
 2016 National Most Outstanding Player: Bryan Lukehart-Yun (Junior) Rockville High School
 2017 National Most Outstanding Player: Franco Bippus (Sophomore) Indiana School for the Deaf
 2018 National Most Outstanding Player: Franco Bippus (Junior) Indiana School for the Deaf
 2019 National Most Outstanding Player: Yael Lenga (Junior) John Hersey High School
 2020 National Most Outstanding Player: Yael Lenga (Senior) John Hersey High School

Trivia 
 Maryland School for the Deaf and Indiana School for the Deaf is tied for leading for winning the most National Academic Bowl Champions, with five titles.
 California School for the Deaf - Riverside's Academic Bowl team was the first academic bowl team to win the inaugural National Deaf Academic Bowl Champion in 1997.
 Only three team had won back-to-back champions, California School for the Deaf - Fremont (1998-1999), Model Secondary School for the Deaf (2000-2001) and Indiana School for the Deaf (2017-2018).
 Maryland School for the Deaf is the only academic bowl team to win four consecutive National Academic Bowl Champions, in 2010, 2011, 2012 and 2013.
 Out of 23 National Academic Bowl tournament, Schools for the Deaf won 18 times and mainstream school/deaf program won five national titles.
 After first nine National Academic Bowl tournaments, Mountain Lakes High School became the first mainstream school/deaf program to win the National Academic Bowl title in 2006.
 David Uzzell was the first player to win back-to-back National Most Outstanding Player awards. Since then, Franco Bippus and Yael Lenga have accomplished that feat.

References

External links
 Official Deaf Academic Bowl Website by Gallaudet University
 Official Deaf Academic Bowl Archives

Deafness organizations
Student quiz competitions